NFL Blitz is a downloadable video game by EA Sports featuring the teams of the National Football League. It is a reboot of the NFL Blitz series, the first Blitz game officially sponsored by the NFL after a number of releases in the Blitz series which did not bear the NFL's official license. It was released in North American territories in January 2012 on both PlayStation Network and Xbox Live Arcade. Baltimore Ravens running back Ray Rice was selected to be the virtual cover athlete of the game. Play by play commentary was provided by Tim Kitzrow and color commentary by Brian Haley.

Development
Following the liquidation of Midway Games in 2009, EA Sports acquired the NFL Blitz intellectual property. In order to emulate the original gameplay elements, EA Tiburon held tournaments with the original arcade version of NFL Blitz.

EA Tiburon worked in relation with the NFL. While the league was supportive of many gameplay elements, they did request that late hits be removed from the game due to their stance on player health and safety.

Reception

The game received "favorable" reviews on both platforms according to the review aggregation website Metacritic.

References

External links
 

2012 video games
NFL Blitz video games
North America-exclusive video games
PlayStation 3 games
PlayStation Network games
Video games developed in the United States
Xbox 360 Live Arcade games
Xbox 360 games